Balak ( — Hebrew for "Balak," a name, the second word, and the first distinctive word, in the parashah) is the 40th weekly Torah portion (parashah) in the annual Jewish cycle of Torah reading and the seventh in the Book of Numbers. In the parashah, Balak son of Zippor, king of Moab, tries to hire Balaam to curse Israel, Balaam's donkey speaks to Balaam, and Balaam blesses Israel instead. The parashah constitutes  The parashah is made up of 5,357 Hebrew letters, 1,455 Hebrew words, 104 verses, and 178 lines in a Torah Scroll (Sefer Torah).

Jews generally read it in late June or July. In most years (for example, 2018, 2019, 2021, 2022, 2024, 2025, and 2028), parashah Balak is read separately. In some years (for example, 2020, 2023, 2026, and 2027) when the second day of Shavuot falls on a Sabbath in the Diaspora (where observant Jews observe Shavuot for two days), parashah Balak is combined with the previous parashah, Chukat, in the Diaspora to synchronize readings thereafter with those in Israel (where Jews observe Shavuot for one day).

The name "Balak" means "devastator", "empty", or "wasting". The name apparently derives from the sparsely used Hebrew verb (balak), "waste or lay waste." There are no derivations of this verb besides this name.

Readings

First reading — Numbers 22:2–12
In the first reading (aliyah), Balak son of Zippor, king of Moab, grew alarmed at the Israelites’ military victories among the Amorites. He consulted with the elders of Midian and sent elders of Moab and Midian to the land by the Euphrates to invite the prophet Balaam to come and curse the Israelites for him. Balaam told them:  "Spend the night here, and I shall reply to you as the Lord may instruct me." God came to Balaam and said: "You must not curse that people, for they are blessed."

Second reading — Numbers 22:13–20
In the second reading (aliyah), in the morning, Balaam asked Balak's dignitaries to leave, as God would not let him go with them, and they left and reported Balaam's answer to Balak. Then Balak sent more numerous and distinguished dignitaries, who offered Balaam rich rewards in return for damning the Israelites. But Balaam replied: "Though Balak were to give me his house full of silver and gold, I could not do anything, big or little, contrary to the command of the Lord my God." Nonetheless, Balaam invited the dignitaries to stay overnight to let Balaam find out what else God might say to him, and that night God told Balaam:  "If these men have come to invite you, you may go with them."

Third reading — Numbers 22:21–38
In the third reading (aliyah), in the morning, Balaam saddled his donkey and departed with the dignitaries, but God was incensed at his going and placed an angel in Balaam's way. When the donkey saw the angel standing in the way holding his drawn sword, the donkey swerved from the road into the fields, and Balaam beat the ass to turn her back onto the road. The angel then stationed himself in a lane with a fence on either side. Seeing the angel, the donkey pressed herself and Balaam's foot against the wall, so he beat her again. The angel then stationed himself on a narrow spot that allowed no room to swerve right or left, and the donkey lay down under Balaam, and Balaam became furious and beat the ass with his stick. Then God allowed the donkey to speak, and she complained to Balaam. And then God allowed Balaam to see the angel, and Balaam bowed down to the ground. The angel questioned Balaam for beating his donkey, noting that she had saved Balaam's life. Balaam admitted his error and offered to turn back if the angel still disapproved. But the angel told Balaam:  "Go with the men.  But you must say nothing except what I tell you."  So Balaam went on. Balak went out to meet Balaam on the Arnon border, and asked him why he didn't come earlier. But Balaam told Balak that he could utter only the words that God put into his mouth.

Fourth reading — Numbers 22:39–23:12
In the fourth reading (aliyah), Balaam and Balak went together to Kiriath-huzoth, where Balak sacrificed oxen and sheep, and they ate. In the morning, Balak took Balaam up to Bamoth-Baal, overlooking the Israelites. Balaam had Balak build seven altars, and they offered up a bull and a ram on each altar. Then Balaam asked Balak to wait while Balaam went off alone to see if God would grant him a manifestation. God appeared to Balaam and told him what to say. Balaam returned and said: "How can I damn whom God has not damned, how doom when the Lord has not doomed? . . .  Who can count the dust of Jacob, number the dust-cloud of Israel?  May I die the death of the upright, may my fate be like theirs!" Balak complained that he had brought Balaam to damn the Israelites, but instead Balaam blessed them. Balaam replied that he could only repeat what God put in his mouth.

Fifth reading — Numbers 23:13–26
In the fifth reading (aliyah), Balak took Balaam to the summit of Pisgah, once offered a bull and a ram on each of seven altars, and once again Balaam asked Balak to wait while Balaam went off alone to seek a manifestation, and once again God told him what to say. Balaam returned and told Balak: "My message was to bless: When He blesses, I cannot reverse it.  No harm is in sight for Jacob, no woe in view for Israel.  The Lord their God is with them." Then Balak told Balaam at least not to bless them, but Balaam replied that he had to do whatever God directed.

Sixth reading — Numbers 23:27–24:13
In the sixth reading (aliyah), Balak took Balaam to the peak of Peor, and once offered a bull and a ram on each of seven altars. Balaam, seeing that it pleased God to bless Israel, immediately turned to the Israelites and blessed them: "How fair are your tents, O Jacob, your dwellings, O Israel! . . .  They shall devour enemy nations, crush their bones, and smash their arrows. . . .  Blessed are they who bless you, accursed they who curse you!" Enraged, Balak complained and dismissed Balaam.

Seventh reading — Numbers 24:14–25:9
In the seventh reading (aliyah), Balaam replied once again that he could not do contrary to God's command, and blessed Israelites once again, saying: "A scepter comes forth from Israel; it smashes the brow of Moab." Then Balaam set out back home, and Balak went his way. While the Israelites stayed at Shittim, the people went whoring with the Moabite women and worshiped their god Baal-peor, enraging God. God told Moses to impale the ringleaders, and Moses directed Israel's officials to slay those who had attached themselves to Baal-peor. When one of the Israelites publicly brought a Midianite woman over to his companions, Phinehas son of Eleazar took a spear, followed the Israelite into the chamber, and stabbed the Israelite and the woman through the belly. Then the plague against the Israelites was checked, having killed 24,000.

Readings according to the triennial cycle
Jews who read the Torah according to the triennial cycle of Torah reading read the parashah according to a different schedule.

In inner-Biblical interpretation
The parashah has parallels or is discussed in these Biblical sources:

Numbers chapter 22
In , the prophet asked Israel to recall that Balak consulted Balaam and Balaam had advised him.

Numbers chapter 23

Numbers chapter 24

Psalm  interprets the words "cedars beside the waters" in Balaam's blessing in  According to  "a tree planted by streams of water" is one "that brings forth its fruit in its season, and whose leaf does not wither."

 prophesied, "A star rises from Jacob, a scepter comes forth from Israel . . . Edom becomes a possession, yea, Seir a possession of its enemies; but Israel is triumphant." Similarly, in  the 8th century BCE prophet Amos announced a prophecy of God: "In that day, I will set up again the fallen booth of David: I will mend its breaches and set up its ruins anew. I will build it firm as in the days of old, so that they shall possess the rest of Edom."

Numbers chapter 25

In the retelling of  God destroyed all the men who followed the Baal of Peor, but kept alive to the day of Moses's address everyone who cleaved to God. Frymer-Kensky concluded that Deuteronomy stresses the moral lesson: Very simply, the guilty perished, and those who were alive to hear Moses were innocent survivors who could avoid destruction by staying fast to God.

In  Phinehas and ten princes of Israelite Tribes questioned the Reubenites’ and Manassites’ later building an altar across the Jordan, recalling that the Israelites had not cleansed themselves to that day of the iniquity of Peor, even though a plague had come upon the congregation at the time. Frymer-Kensky noted that the book of Joshua emphasizes the collective nature of sin and punishment, that the transgression of the Israelites at Peor still hung over them, and that any sin of the Reubenites and Manassites would bring down punishment on all Israel.

In  God recalled Israel's rebellion and God's resolve to pour out God's fury on them in the wilderness.  God held back then for the sake of God's Name, but swore that God would scatter them among the nations, because they looked with longing at idols. Frymer-Kensky called Ezekiel's memory the most catastrophic: Because the Israelites rebelled in the Baal-Peor incident, God vowed that they would ultimately lose the Land that they had not yet even entered. Even after the exile to Babylon, the incident loomed large in Israel's memory.

 reports that the Israelites attached themselves to Baal Peor and ate sacrifices offered to the dead, provoking God's anger and a plague.  reports that Phinehas stepped forward and intervened, the plague ceased, and it was reckoned to his merit forever. Frymer-Kensky noted that the  like  includes a savior, a salvation, and an explanation of the monopoly of the priesthood by the descendants of Phineas. Professor Michael Fishbane of the University of Chicago wrote that in retelling the story, the Psalmist notably omitted the explicit account of Phinehas's violent lancing of the offenders and substituted an account of the deed that could be read as nonviolent.

 reports that Balaam counseled the Israelites to break faith with God in the sin of Baal-Peor.

 states that the Israelites killed Balaam “the soothsayer” during war.

In classical rabbinic interpretation
The parashah is discussed in these rabbinic sources from the era of the Mishnah and the Talmud:

Numbers chapter 22
A Baraita taught that Moses wrote the Torah, the portion of Balaam, and the book of Job.

A Midrash explained that the Torah records Balaam's story to make known that because the nonbeliever prophet Balaam did what he did, God removed prophecy and the Holy Spirit from nonbelievers. The Midrash taught that God originally wished to deprive nonbelievers of the opportunity to argue that God had estranged them. So in an application of the principle of  “The Rock, His work is perfect; for all His ways are Justice,” God raised up kings, sages, and prophets for both Israel and nonbelievers alike. Just as God raised up Moses for Israel, God raised up Balaam for the nonbelievers. Thus God removed prophecy from nonbelievers.

Reading  "And the Lord spoke to me, ‘Distress not the Moabites, neither contend with them in battle,’" Ulla argued that it certainly could not have entered the mind of Moses to wage war without God's authorization.  So we must deduce that Moses on his own reasoned that if in the case of the Midianites who came only to assist the Moabites (in ), God commanded (in ), "Vex the Midianites and smite them," in the case of the Moabites themselves, the same injunction should apply even more strongly.  But God told Moses that his idea was incorrect.  For God was to bring two doves forth from the Moabites and the Ammonites — Ruth the Moabitess and Naamah the Ammonitess.

Classical Rabbinic interpretation viewed Balaam unfavorably. The Mishnah taught that Balaam was one of four commoners who have no portion in the World To Come, along with Doeg, Ahitophel, and Gehazi. Following the teaching of Rabbi Joshua, the Gemara deduced from the Mishnah's statement that the gentile Balaam would not enter the World To Come, while other gentiles would. The Gemara read Balaam's name to demonstrate that he was "without a people" (belo am). Alternatively, the Gemara read Balaam's name to demonstrate that he "confused a people" (bilah am), namely the Israelites. A Tanna taught that Beor was the same person as Cushan-rishathaim and Laban. Noting that  calls Balaam "the son of Beor" while  says of Balaam "his son [was] Beor," Rabbi Joḥanan deduced that Balaam's father Beor was like his son (less able) in matters of prophecy.

Similarly, the Mishnah taught that anyone who has an evil eye, a haughty spirit, and an over-ambitious soul is a disciple of Balaam the wicked, and is destined for Gehinnom and descent into the pit of destruction.  The Mishnah taught that  speaks of the disciples of Balaam when it says, "You, o God, will bring them down to the nethermost pit; men of blood and deceit shall not live out half their days.

Reading the description of  "Balaam also the son of Beor, the soothsayer," the Gemara asked why  describes Balaam merely as a soothsayer when he was also a prophet.  Rabbi Joḥanan taught that at first, Balaam was a prophet, but at the end, he was merely a soothsayer.  Rav Papa observed that this is an application of the popular saying that she who descended from princes and governors played the harlot with laborers (showing that she had no conception of the dignity of her beginnings).

Interpreting the words, "And the elders of Moab and the elders of Midian departed," in  a Tanna taught that there never was peace between Midian and Moab, comparing them to two dogs in a kernel that always fought each other. Then a wolf attacked one, and the other concluded that if he did not help the first, then the wolf would attack the second tomorrow.  So they joined to fight the wolf.  And Rav Papa likened the cooperation of Moab and Midian to the saying: "The weasel and cat had a feast on the fat of the luckless."

Noting that  makes no mention of the princes of Midian, the Gemara deduced that they despaired as soon as Balaam told them (in ) that he would listen to God's instructions, for they reasoned that God would not curse Israel any more than a father would hate his son.

Noting that in  God told Balaam, "You shall not go with them," yet in  after Balaam impudently asked God a second time, God told Balaam, "Rise up and go with them," Rav Nachman concluded that impudence, even in the face of Heaven, sometimes brings results.

A Midrash taught that the words of  "And God came to Balaam at night," indicated God's distance from Balaam.  Rabbi Leazar taught that the words of  "The Lord is far from the wicked," refer to the prophets of other nations.  But the continuation of  "He hears the prayer of the righteous," refers to the prophets of Israel.  God appears to nations other that Israel only as one who comes from a distance, as  says, "They came from a far country to me."  But in connection with the prophets of Israel,  says, "And the Lord appeared," and  says, "And the Lord called," implying from the immediate vicinity.  Rabbi Haninah compared the difference between the prophets of Israel and the prophets of other nations to a king who was with his friend in a chamber (separated by a curtain).  Whenever the king desired to speak to his friend, he folded up the curtain and spoke to him.  (But God speaks to the prophets of other nations without folding back the curtain.)  The Rabbis compared it to a king who has a wife and a concubine; to his wife he goes openly, but to his concubine he repairs with stealth.  Similarly, God appears to non-Jews only at night, as  says, "And God came to Balaam at night," and  says, "And God came to Laban the Aramean in a dream of the night."

A Tanna taught in the name of Rabbi Simeon ben Eleazar that intense love and hate can cause one to disregard the perquisites of one's social position.  The Tanna deduced that love may do so from Abraham, for  reports that "Abraham rose early in the morning, and saddled his donkey," rather than allow his servant to do so.  Similarly, the Tanna deduced that hate may do so from Balaam, for  reports that "Balaam rose up in the morning, and saddled his donkey," rather than allow his servant to do so.

Reading  a Midrash remarked on the irony that the villain Balaam was going to curse an entire nation that had not sinned against him, yet he had to smite his donkey to prevent it from going into a field.

Expanding on  the Gemara reported a conversation among Balak's emissaries, Balaam, and Balaam's donkey.  Balak's emissaries asked Balaam, "Why didn’t you ride your horse?" Balaam replied, "I have put it out to pasture." But Balaam's donkey asked Balaam (in the words of ), "Am I not your donkey?" Balaam replied, "Merely for carrying loads." Balaam's donkey said (in the words of ), "Upon which you have ridden." Balaam replied, "That was only by chance." Balaam's donkey insisted (in the words of ), "Ever since I was yours until this day."

The school of Rabbi Natan taught that the Torah contains an abbreviation in  “And the angel of the Lord said to him:  Why did you hit your donkey these three times?  Behold I have come out as an adversary because your way is contrary (yarat) against me.” The school of Rabbi Natan interpreted the word , yarat, as an abbreviation for, “The donkey feared (yare’ah), it saw (ra’atah), and it turned aside (natetah).

Numbers chapter 23
Rabbi Joḥanan deduced from the words "and he walked haltingly" in  that Balaam was disabled in one leg.

Similarly, a Midrash taught that God controlled Balaam's mouth as a person who puts a bit into the mouth of a beast and makes it go in the direction the person pleases.

Rabbi Samuel bar Nahmani interpreted the words "that the Lord your God shall keep for you" in  teaching that all the good that Israel enjoys in this world results from the blessings with which Balaam blessed Israel, but the blessings with which the Patriarchs blessed Israel are reserved for the time to come, as signified by the words, "that the Lord your God shall keep for you."

The Gemara taught that by the words "that you may know the righteous acts of the Lord," God meant to say to the Israelites, "You should know how many acts of charity I performed for you, in that I did not become angry all that time, in the days of wicked Balaam; for had I become angry at that time, no Israelite would have remained alive or been spared." And the Gemara indicated that this is why Balaam told Balak in  "How can I curse whom God has not cursed? or how shall I become angry, when the Lord has not become angry?" For Balaam knew that God was not angry at the Israelites. The Gemara thus concluded that for all of the time of the Balaam story, God had not been angry.

The Pirke De-Rabbi Eliezer taught that Balaam saw the wilderness filled with the Israelites' foreskins after they had circumcised themselves, and asked who would be able to arise by the merit of the blood of the covenant of this circumcision, which was covered by the dust, and thus in  Balaam said, "Who can count the dust of Jacob?"

The Gemara interpreted those words to mean that if Balaam died a natural death like the righteous, then his end would be like that of the Jewish people, but if he died a violent death, then he would go to the same fate as the wicked.

Rabbi Hiyya bar Abba taught in the name of Rabbi Joḥanan that when in  Balaam said, "Let me die the death of the righteous," he sought the death of the Patriarchs Abraham, Isaac, and Jacob, who were called righteous.

A Midrash taught that God concealed Balaam's fate from him until he had already sealed his fate. When he then saw his future, he began to pray for his soul in  "Let my soul die the death of the righteous."

The Tosefta read  “as a lion . . . he shall not lie down until he eats of the prey, and drinks the blood of the slain,” to support the categorization of blood as a “drink” for the purpose of Sabbath limitations.

Numbers chapter 24
Rabbi Joḥanan interpreted  to support the rule of Mishnah Bava Batra 3:7 that a person should not construct a house so that its doorway opens directly opposite another doorway across a courtyard. Rabbi Joḥanan taught that the words of  "And Balaam lifted up his eyes and he saw Israel dwelling according to their tribes," indicate that Balaam saw that the doors of their tents did not exactly face each other (and that the Israelites thus respected each other's privacy).

Rabbi Abbahu explained how Balaam became blind in one eye. Rabbi Abbahu interpreted the words of Balaam's blessing in  "Who has counted the dust of Jacob, or numbered the stock of Israel?" to teach that God counts the cohabitations of Israel, awaiting the appearance of the drop from which a righteous person might grow. Balaam questioned how God Who is pure and holy and Whose ministers are pure and holy could look upon such a thing.

Thus Balaam wished to curse the Israelites to have no synagogues or school-houses, for  "How goodly are your tents, O Jacob," refers to synagogues and school-houses. Balaam wished that the Shechinah should not rest upon the Israelites, for in  "and your tabernacles, O Israel," the Tabernacle symbolizes the Divine Presence. Balaam wished that the Israelites' kingdom should not endure, for  "As the valleys are they spread forth," symbolizes the passing of time. Balaam wished that the Israelites might have no olive trees and vineyards, for in  he said, "as gardens by the river's side." Balaam wished that the Israelites' smell might not be fragrant, for in  he said, "as aloes planted of the Lord." Balaam wished that the Israelites' kings might not be tall, for in  he said, "and as cedar trees beside the waters." Balaam wished that the Israelites might not have a king who was the son of a king (and thus that they would have unrest and civil war), for in  he said, "He shall pour the water out of his buckets," signifying that one king would descend from another. Balaam wished that the Israelites' kingdom might not rule over other nations, for in  he said, "and his seed shall be in many waters." Balaam wished that the Israelites' kingdom might not be strong, for in  he said, "and his king shall be higher than Agag. Balaam wished that the Israelites’ kingdom might not be awe-inspiring, for in  he said, "and his kingdom shall be exalted. Rabbi Abba bar Kahana said that all of Balaam's curses, which God turned into blessings, reverted to curses (and Balaam's intention was eventually fulfilled), except the synagogues and schoolhouses, for  says, "But the Lord your God turned the curse into a blessing for you, because the Lord your God loved you," using the singular "curse," and not the plural "curses" (so that God turned only the first intended curse permanently into a blessing, namely that concerning synagogues and school-houses, which are destined never to disappear from Israel).

A Midrash told that when the Israelites asked Balaam when salvation would come, Balaam replied in the words of  "I see him (the Messiah), but not now; I behold him, but not near." God asked the Israelites whether they had lost their sense, for they should have known that Balaam would eventually descend to Gehinnom, and therefore did not wish God's salvation to come.  God counseled the Israelites to be like Jacob, who said in  "I wait for Your salvation, O Lord." The Midrash taught that God counseled the Israelites to wait for salvation, which is at hand, as  says, "For My salvation is near to come."

Numbers chapter 25
Rabbi Joḥanan taught that wherever Scripture uses the term "And he abode" (vayeishev), as it does in  it presages trouble.  Thus in  "And Israel abode in Shittim" is followed by "and the people began to commit whoredom with the daughters of Moab."  In  "And Jacob dwelt in the land where his father was a stranger, in the land of Canaan," is followed by  "and Joseph brought to his father their evil report."  In  "And Israel dwelt in the land of Egypt, in the country of Goshen," is followed by  "And the time drew near that Israel must die."  In  "And Judah and Israel dwelt safely, every man under his vine and under his fig tree," is followed by  "And the Lord stirred up an adversary unto Solomon, Hadad the Edomite; he was the king's seed in Edom."

A Midrash taught that God heals with the very thing with which God wounds.  Thus, Israel sinned in Shittim (so called because of its many acacia trees), as  says, "And Israel abode in Shittim, and the people began to commit harlotry with the daughters of Moab" (and also worshipped the Baal of Peor).  But it was also through Shittim wood, or acacia-wood, that God healed the Israelites, for as  reports, "Bezalel made the Ark of acacia-wood."

Rabbi Judah taught that the words of  "The counsel of the wicked is far from me," refer to the counsel of Balaam, the wicked, who advised Midian, resulting in the death of 24,000 Israelite men.  Rabbi Judah recounted that Balaam advised the Midianites that they would not be able to prevail over the Israelites unless the Israelites had sinned before God.  So the Midianites made booths outside the Israelite camp and sold all kinds of merchandise.  The young Israelite men went beyond the Israelite camp and saw the young Midianite women, who had painted their eyes like harlots, and they took wives from among them, and went astray after them, as  says, "And the people began to commit whoredom with the daughters of Moab."

Rabbi Hama son of Rabbi Hanina taught that Moses was buried near Beth-Peor to atone for the incident at Beth-Peor in 

The Rabbis taught that if a witness accused someone of worshipping an idol, the judges would ask, among other questions, whether the accused worshiped Peor (as  reports that the Israelites did).

Rabbah bar bar Hana said in Rabbi Joḥanan's name that had Zimri withdrawn from Cozbi and Phinehas still killed him, Phinehas would have been liable to execution for murder, and had Zimri killed Phinehas in self-defense, he would not have been liable to execution for murder, as Phinehas was a pursuer seeking to take Zimri's life.

The Gemara related what took place after, as  reports, "Moses said to the judges of Israel: ‘Slay everyone his men who have joined themselves to the Baal of Peor.’"  The tribe of Simeon went to Zimri complaining that capital punishment was being meted out while he sat silently.  So Zimri assembled 24,000 Israelites and went to Cozbi and demanded that she surrender herself to him.  She replied that she was a king's daughter and her father had instructed her not to submit to any but to the greatest of men.  Zimri replied that he was the prince of a tribe and that his tribe was greater than that of Moses, for Simeon was second in birth, while Levi was third.  Zimri then seized Cozbi by her hair and brought her before Moses.  Zimri demanded that Moses rule whether Cozbi was forbidden or permitted to Zimri.  Zimri continued that if Moses were to say that Cozbi was forbidden to Zimri, then who permitted Moses to marry the Midianite woman Zipporah?  At that moment, Moses forgot the law governing intimacy with an idolatrous woman, and all the people burst into tears, as  reports when it says, "they were weeping at the door of the tent of meeting."

Interpreting the words, "And Phineas, the son of Eleazar, the son of Aaron the priest, saw it," in  the Gemara asked what Phineas saw.  Rav said that Phineas saw what was happening and remembered the law governing intimacy with an idolatrous woman, and asked Moses whether he had not taught that zealots may punish one who cohabits with an idolatrous woman.  Moses replied that he who reads the letter should be the agent to carry out its instructions.  Alternatively, Samuel said that Phineas saw that (in the words of ) "There is no wisdom nor understanding nor counsel against the Lord," which he interpreted to mean that whenever the Divine Name is being profaned, one may relax the general principle that one must defer to one's teacher — the giver of wisdom — and go ahead to make a legal decision in the presence of one's teacher.  Rabbi Isaac said in Rabbi Eleazar's name that Phineas saw the Angel of Death wreaking destruction among the people, and (in the words of ) "he rose up out of the midst of the congregation, and took a spear in his hand."  Thus, Phineas must not have had his spear when he sat among the congregation, and from this we learn that one may not enter a house of learning with weapons.

Reading the words of  "When Phinehas the son of Eleazar, son of Aaron the priest, saw," the Jerusalem Talmud asked what he saw. The Jerusalem Talmud answered that he saw the incident and remembered the law that zealots may beat up one who has sexual relations with an Aramean woman. But the Jerusalem Talmud reported that it was taught that this was not with the approval of sages. Rabbi Judah bar Pazzi taught that the sages wanted to excommunicate Phinehas, but the Holy Spirit rested upon him and stated the words of   "And it shall be to him, and to his descendants after him, the covenant of a perpetual priesthood, because he was jealous for his God, and made atonement for the people of Israel."

The Gemara taught that Phineas then removed the point of the spear and hid it in his clothes, and went along leaning upon the shaft of the spear as a walking stick.  When he reached the tribe of Simeon, he asked why the tribe of Levi should not have the moral standards of the tribe of Simeon.  Thereupon the Simeonites allowed him to pass through, saying that he had come to satisfy his lust.  The Simeonites concluded that even the abstainers had then declared cohabiting wit Midianite women permissible.

Rabbi Joḥanan taught that Phinehas was able to accomplish his act of zealotry only because God performed six miracles:  First, upon hearing Phinehas's warning, Zimri should have withdrawn from Cozbi and ended his transgression, but he did not.  Second, Zimri should have cried out for help from his fellow Simeonites, but he did not.  Third, Phinheas was able to drive his spear exactly through the sexual organs of Zimri and Cozbi as they were engaged in the act.  Fourth, Zimri and Cozbi did not slip off the spear, but remained fixed so that others could witness their transgression.  Fifth, an angel came and lifted up the lintel so that Phinheas could exit holding the spear.  And sixth, an angel came and sowed destruction among the people, distracting the Simeonites from killing Phinheas.

The interpreters of Scripture by symbol taught that the deeds of Phinehas explained why  directed that the priests were to receive the foreleg, cheeks, and stomach of sacrifices.  The foreleg represented the hand of Phinehas, as  reports that Phinehas "took a spear in his hand."  The cheeks' represent the prayer of Phinehas, as  reports, "Then Phinehas stood up and prayed, and so the plague was stayed."  The stomach was to be taken in its literal sense, for  reports that Phinehas "thrust . . . the woman through her belly."

The Gemara asked whether the words in  "And Eleazar Aaron's son took him one of the daughters of Putiel to wife" did not convey that Eleazar's son Phinehas descended from Jethro, who fattened (piteim) calves for idol worship.  The Gemara then provided an alternative explanation:   could mean that Phinehas descended from Joseph, who conquered (pitpeit) his passions (resisting Potiphar's wife, as reported in ).  But the Gemara asked, did not the tribes sneer at Phinehas and question how a youth (Phinehas) whose mother's father crammed calves for idol-worship could kill the head of a tribe in Israel — Zimri, Prince of Simeon — as reported in  The Gemara explained that the real explanation was that Phinehas descended from both Joseph and Jethro.  If Phinehas's mother's father descended from Joseph, then Phinehas's mother's mother descended from Jethro.  And if Phinehas's mother's father descended from Jethro, then Phinehas's mother's mother descended from Joseph.  The Gemara explained that  implies this dual explanation of "Putiel" when it says, "of the daughters of Putiel," because the plural "daughters" implies two lines of ancestry (from both Joseph and Jethro).

In medieval Jewish interpretation
The parashah is discussed in these medieval Jewish sources:

Numbers chapter 22
Noting that  reports that "the she-donkey saw" but Balaam did not see, Rashi explained that God permitted the animal to perceive more than the person, as a person possesses intelligence and would be driven insane by the sight of a harmful spirit.

Numbers chapter 23

Judah Halevi, however, saw in Balaam's prophetic prayer that his death might be made easy and his end be as the end of the Israelites an allusion to the immortality of the soul, the afterlife, and the resurrection of the dead. Similarly, Ibn Ezra stated his belief that Balaam wanted his end to be like the end of Israel, who are God's portion and granted a share in the World To Come. Ibn Ezra also noted that others said that "my end" repeats "let me die," for Balaam knew that he would die by the sword. Similarly, Nachmanides wrote that Balaam saw that the righteous would be inheritors of the Garden of Eden and life after death, and that Israel's "portion is in [eternal] life" (in the words of ) and not in Gehenna and destruction. Thus Nachmanides read Balaam's prophecy to say that God does not want the Jews to be cursed and their end will be good, according to the way of the righteous. And the early 14th century Spanish commentator Bachya ben Asher also read Balaam to wish for death, provided that his death would an eternal future like the Israelites, who Bachya saw as an integral part of God. Citing Ibn Ezra, Bachya noted that Balaam had foreseen a violent death by the sword for himself. Bachya read Balaam's prophecy to reveal that there is a world after death of the body consisting of disembodied souls, and that there is also a resurrection at a later time when these disembodied souls will be reunited with their former bodies. In Bachya's view, Balaam expressed the hope that when he died, his soul would qualify for immediate transfer to that world (and not to the place where his soul would be being judged). Bachya concluded that Balaam's wish for this kind of death and afterlife for himself was proof that he paid the Jewish people the greatest possible compliment.

Numbers chapter 25
Following the Mishnah (see “In classical rabbinic interpretation” above), Maimonides acknowledged that based on Phinehas's slaying of Zimri, a zealot would be considered praiseworthy to strike a man who has sexual relations with a gentile woman in public, that is, in the presence of ten or more Jews. But Maimonides taught that the zealot could strike the fornicators only when they were actually engaged in the act, as was the case with Zimri, and if the transgressor ceased, he should not be slain, and if the zealot then killed the transgressor, the zealot could be executed as a murderer. Further, Maimonides taught that if the zealot came to ask permission from the court to kill the transgressor, the court should not instruct the zealot to do so, even if the zealot consulted the court during the act.

In modern interpretation
The parashah is discussed in these modern sources:

Numbers chapter 22
Spinoza concluded that other nations, like the Jews, thus had their prophets who prophesied to them. And Spinoza concluded that Jews, apart from their social organization and government, possessed no gift of God above other peoples, and that there was no difference between Jews and non-Jews.<ref>Baruch Spinoza. Theologico-Political Treatise, chapter 3. Amsterdam, 1670. Reprinted in, e.g., Baruch Spinoza. Theological-Political Treatise. Translated by Samuel Shirley, pages 40–41. Indianapolis: Hackett Publishing Company, second edition, 2001. .</ref>

Professor Robert Alter of the University of California, Berkeley, observed that the Balaam narrative builds on repeated key words and actions, but repeats only certain phrases and dialogue verbatim. In  Balak saw what Israel did to the Amorites; in a vision in  Balaam saw Israel below him; in his last prophecy in  Balaam foresaw Israel's future. Alter noted that all this "hullabaloo of visionary practice" stands in ironic contrast to Balaam's blindness to the angel his donkey could plainly see, until in  God chose to "unveil his eyes." Alter concluded that the story insists that God is the exclusive source of vision. Alter also noted reiterated phrase-motifs bearing on blessings and curses. In  Balak sent for Balaam to curse Israel believing that "Whom you bless is blessed and whom you curse is cursed." In  God set matters straight using the same two verb-stems: "You shall not curse the people, for it is blessed." In  Balaam concluded: "From Aram did Balak lead me . . . : ‘Go, curse me Jacob, and go, doom Israel.’ What can I curse that El has not cursed, and what can I doom that the Lord has not doomed?" Alter observed that Balaam was a poet as well as a seer, and taught that the story ultimately addresses whether language confers or confirms blessings and curses, and what the source of language's power is.

Professor Nili Sacher Fox of Hebrew Union College-Jewish Institute of Religion noted that Balaam’s talking donkey, whom  portrays as wiser than Balaam, is a jenny, a female donkey, perhaps reminiscent of the biblical personification of wisdom (chochmah) as female in, for example, 

Rabbi Diane Aronson Cohen of Temple Ohev Shalom in Colonia, New Jersey, wrote that the story of Balaam and his donkey in  provides an important model of an abuser venting misdirected anger in verbal abuse and physical violence.  Cohen noted that the recipient of the abuse finally decided that she had had enough and stopped the abuse by speaking up.  Cohen taught that we learn from the donkey that if we are on the receiving end of abuse, we have an obligation to speak out against our abuser.

Numbers chapter 23
Leibowitz noted that Israel’s prophets did not run after prophecy, while Balaam hankered after prophecy, striving through magical means to force such power down from Heaven. Leibowitz marked a change in Balaam’s third address, however, when  reports, “the spirit of God came upon him.”

Numbers chapter 24

Numbers chapter 25
Olson noted these similarities: (1) In both stories, the people worship and make sacrifices to another god. (2) Both stories involve foreigners, in the Egyptians’ gold for the calf and the women of Moab and Midian. (5) Because of their obedience in carrying out God's punishment on the idolaters, the Levites are ordained for the service of God, and in  the priest Phinehas executes God's punishment on the sinners, and a special covenant of perpetual priesthood is established with him. (6) After the Golden Calf incident, Moses “makes atonement” for Israel, and in the Baal Peor episode, Phinehas “makes atonement” for Israel. (7) A plague is sent as punishment in both incidents.

Professor George Buchanan Gray of Mansfield College, Oxford, in the late 19th and early 20th centuries, wrote that the Israelite men's participation in the sacrificial feasts followed their intimacy with the women, who then naturally invited their paramours to their feasts, which, according to custom, were sacrificial occasions. Gray considered that it would have been in accord with the sentiment of early Israelites to worship the Moabite god on his own territory. Similarly, Professor Frymer-Kensky of Chicago University wrote that the cataclysm began with a dinner invitation from the Moabite women, who perhaps wanted to be friendly with the people whom Balaam had tried, but failed, to curse.

Since the nature of Phinehas's act, killing with his own hands, left his heart filled with intense emotional unrest, God provided a means to soothe him so that he could cope with his situation and find peace and tranquility.

Professor Tamara Cohn Eskenazi of the Hebrew Union College-Jewish Institute of Religion found the opening scene of  disturbing for a number of reasons: (1) because the new generation of Israelites fell prey to idolatry within view of the Promised Land; (2) because God rewarded Phinehas for acting violently and without recourse to due process; and (3) because women receive disproportionate blame for the people's downfall. Eskenazi taught that God rewarded Phinehas, elevating him above other descendants of Aaron, because of Phinehas's swift and ruthless response to idolatry, unlike his grandfather Aaron, who collaborated with idolaters in the case of the Golden Calf. By demonstrating unflinching loyalty to God, Phinehas restored the stature of the priests as deserving mediators between Israel and God. Eskenazi noted that although God ordered death for all the ringleaders in  Phinehas satisfied God's demand for punishment by killing only two leaders, thereby causing less rather than more bloodshed.

Commandments
According to Maimonides and Sefer ha-Chinuch, there are no commandments in the parashah.

Haftarah

The haftarah for the parashah is  When parashah Balak is combined with parashah Chukat (as it is in 2020, 2023, 2026, and 2027), the haftarah remains the haftarah for Balak.

Connection between the haftarah and the parashah
In the haftarah in  Micah quotes God's admonition to the Israelites to recall the events of the parashah, to "remember now what Balak king of Moab devised, and what Balaam the son of Beor answered him."

The haftarah in classical rabbinic interpretation
The Gemara read the closing admonition of the haftarah, ""to do justly, and to love mercy, and to walk humbly with your God," as one of several distillations of the principles underlying the Torah.  Rabbi Simlai taught that God communicated 613 precepts to Moses.  David reduced them to eleven principles, as  says, "Lord, who shall sojourn in Your Tabernacle?  Who shall dwell in Your holy mountain? — He who [1] walks uprightly, and [2] works righteousness, and [3] speaks truth in his heart; who [4] has no slander upon his tongue, [5] nor does evil to his fellow, [6] nor takes up a reproach against his neighbor, [7] in whose eyes a vile person is despised, but [8] he honors them who fear the Lord, [9] he swears to his own hurt and changes not, [10] he puts not out his money on interest, [11] nor takes a bribe against the innocent." Isaiah reduced them to six principles, as  says, "He who [1] walks righteously, and [2] speaks uprightly, [3] he who despises the gain of oppressions, [4] who shakes his hand from holding of bribes, [5] who stops his ear from hearing of blood, [6] and shuts his eyes from looking upon evil; he shall dwell on high." Micah reduced them to three principles, as  says, "It has been told you, o man, what is good, and what the Lord requires of you: only [1] to do justly, and [2] to love mercy, and [3] to walk humbly before your God." The Gemara interpreted "to do justly" to mean maintaining justice; "to love mercy" to mean rendering every kind office, and "walking humbly before your God" to mean walking in funeral and bridal processions.  And the Gemara concluded that if the Torah enjoins "walking humbly" in public matters, it is ever so much more requisite in matters that usually call for modesty.  Returning to the commandments of the Torah, Isaiah reduced them to two principles, as  says, "Thus says the Lord, [1] Keep justice and [2] do righteousness." Amos reduced them to one principle, as  says, "For thus says the Lord to the house of Israel, ‘Seek Me and live.’" To this Rav Nahman bar Isaac demurred, saying that this might be taken as: Seek Me by observing the whole Torah and live.  The Gemara concluded that Habakkuk based all the Torah's commandments on one principle, as  says, "But the righteous shall live by his faith."

In the liturgy

Balaam's blessing of Israel in  constitutes the first line of the Ma Tovu prayer often said upon entering a synagogue or at the beginning of morning services.  These words are the only prayer in the siddur attributed to a non-Jew.

The Weekly Maqam
In the Weekly Maqam, Sephardi Jews each week base the songs of the services on the content of that week's parashah.  For parashah Balak, Sephardi Jews apply Maqam Mahour, the maqam that portrays emotional instability and anger.  This maqam is similar to Maqam Rast in tune, except that it is higher in key.  It is appropriate, because in this parashah, Balak became angered as the curses of Balaam turned into blessings.

See also
Islamic view of Balaam

Notes

Further reading
The parashah has parallels or is discussed in these sources:

Ancient
Deir Alla Inscription. Deir Alla, circa 9th–8th century BCE. Reprinted in, e.g., "The Deir ʿAlla Plaster Inscriptions (2.27) (The Book of Balaam, son of Beor)." In The Context of Scripture, Volume II: Monumental Inscriptions from the Biblical World. Edited by William W. Hallo, pages 140–45. New York: Brill, 2000. . See also Jo Ann Hackett, Balaam Text from Deir 'Alla. Chico, California: Scholars Press, 1984.

Biblical
 (talking animal);  (rose early in the morning, and saddled his ass, and took two of his young men with him).
 (sacrifices to another god; zealots kill apostates; zealots rewarded with priestly standing; plague as punishment; leader makes atonement);  (foreign women and apostasy).
 (Balaam; Phinehas, war with Midian).

 (Baal Peor);  (Balaam).
 (Balaam the son of Beor the sorcerer);  (Baal Peor); 
 (tents, dwellings).
 (Baal Peor).
 (Balaam).

 (like a tree planted);  (lying lips be dumb);  (God brings the counsel of the nations to nothing);  (disregard for the wealth of this world);  (speaking a parable);  (shout);  (Baal Peor);  (rod out of Zion);  (precious to God the death of God's servants).

Early nonrabbinic
1 Maccabees chs. 1–16. (parallel to Phinehas).
4 Maccabees 18:12.
Instruction for Catechumens, and A Prayer of Praise of God for His Greatness, and for His Appointment of Leaders for His People. In "Hellenistic Synagogal Prayers," in James H. Charlesworth. The Old Testament Pseudepigrapha, volume 2, pages 687–88. New York: Doubleday, 1985. .
Pseudo-Philo 18:1–14; 28:1–4. Land of Israel, 1st century. Reprinted in, e.g., The Old Testament Pseudepigrapha: Volume 2: Expansions of the "Old Testament" and Legends, Wisdom and Philosophical Literature, Prayers, Psalms, and Odes, Fragments of Lost Judeo-Hellenistic works.  Edited by James H. Charlesworth, pages 324–36. New York: Anchor Bible, 1985. .
Matthew  Antioch, circa 80–90. (See also R.E. Brown, "The Balaam Narrative," The Birth of the Messiah, pages 190–96. Garden City, New York, 1977.)
Josephus, Antiquities of the Jews 6:1–7. Circa 93–94. Reprinted in, e.g., The Works of Josephus: Complete and Unabridged, New Updated Edition. Translated by William Whiston, pages 108–10. Peabody, Massachusetts: Hendrickson Publishers, 1987. .
2 Peter  (Balaam).
Jude  (Balaam).
 Late 1st century. (Balaam).

Classical rabbinic
Mishnah: Sanhedrin 9:6; 10:2; Avot 5:6, 19. Land of Israel, circa 200 CE. Reprinted in, e.g., The Mishnah: A New Translation. Translated by Jacob Neusner, pages 604, 686, 689. New Haven: Yale University Press, 1988. .
Tosefta Shabbat 8:23. Land of Israel, circa 250 CE. Reprinted in, e.g., The Tosefta: Translated from the Hebrew, with a New Introduction. Translated by Jacob Neusner, volume 1, pages 384–85. Peabody, Massachusetts: Hendrickson Publishers, 2002. .

Jerusalem Talmud: Maaser Sheni 44b; Shabbat 48b; Beitzah 45a; Rosh Hashanah 20b; Taanit 10a, 27b; Nedarim 12a; Sotah 28b, 47b; Sanhedrin 10a. Tiberias, Land of Israel, circa 400 CE. Reprinted in, e.g., Talmud Yerushalmi. Edited by Chaim Malinowitz, Yisroel Simcha Schorr, and Mordechai Marcus, volumes 10, 14, 23–25, 33, 36–37. Brooklyn: Mesorah Publications, 2006–2017. And reprinted in, e.g., The Jerusalem Talmud: A Translation and Commentary. Edited by Jacob Neusner and translated by Jacob Neusner, Tzvee Zahavy, B. Barry Levy, and Edward Goldman. Peabody, Massachusetts: Hendrickson Publishers, 2009. .
Genesis Rabbah 18:5; 19:11;  39:8; 41:3; 51:10–11; 52:5; 53:4; 55:8. Land of Israel, 5th century. Reprinted in, e.g., Midrash Rabbah: Genesis. Translated by Harry Freedman and Maurice Simon, volume 1, pages 143–45, 156–57, 316, 334, 449–50, 453–54, 463–64, 488–89; volume 2, pages 603, 655, 662, 680–81, 862, 876, 886, 955, 981–82. London: Soncino Press, 1939. .
Babylonian Talmud: Berakhot 7a, 12b, 16a, 38a; 
Shabbat 64a, 105a; Pesachim 54a, 111a; Rosh Hashanah 11a, 32b; Taanit 20a; Chagigah 2a; Nedarim 32a, 81a; Nazir 23b; Sotah 10a, 11a, 14a, 41b, 43a, 46b, 47a; Gittin 68b; Kiddushin 4a; Bava Kamma 38a; Bava Batra 14b, 60a, 109b; Sanhedrin 34b–35a, 39b, 40b, 44a, 56a, 64a, 82a, 92a, 93b, 105a–06a; Makkot 10b; Avodah Zarah 4b, 25a, 44b; Horayot 10b; Menachot 66b; Chullin 19b, 35b, 134b; Bekhorot 5b; Keritot 22a; Niddah 19b, 31a, 55b. Babylonia, 6th century. Reprinted in, e.g., Talmud Bavli. Edited by Yisroel Simcha Schorr, Chaim Malinowitz, and Mordechai Marcus, 72 volumes. Brooklyn: Mesorah Pubs., 2006.

Medieval

Solomon ibn Gabirol. A Crown for the King, 36:493. Spain, 11th century. Translated by David R. Slavitt, pages 66–67. New York: Oxford University Press, 1998. .
Rashi. Commentary. Numbers 22–25. Troyes, France, late 11th century. Reprinted in, e.g., Rashi. The Torah: With Rashi's Commentary Translated, Annotated, and Elucidated. Translated and annotated by Yisrael Isser Zvi Herczeg, volume 4, pages 269–317. Brooklyn: Mesorah Publications, 1997. .
Rashbam. Commentary on the Torah. Troyes, early 12th century. Reprinted in, e.g., Rashbam's Commentary on Leviticus and Numbers: An Annotated Translation. Edited and translated by Martin I. Lockshin, pages 263–84. Providence: Brown Judaic Studies, 2001. .
Judah Halevi. Kuzari, part 1, ¶ 115. Toledo, Spain, 1130–1140. Reprinted in, e.g., Jehuda Halevi. Kuzari: An Argument for the Faith of Israel. Introduction by Henry Slonimsky, page 80. New York: Schocken, 1964. .
Numbers Rabbah 20:1–25. 12th century. Reprinted in, e.g., Midrash Rabbah: Numbers. Translated by Judah J. Slotki, volume 5, pages 26, 37, 44, 46, 55, 368, 407, 420, 470, 484; volume 6, pages 630, 634–35, 786–826, 829, 856, 873. London: Soncino Press, 1939. .
Abraham ibn Ezra. Commentary on the Torah. Mid-12th century. Reprinted in, e.g., Ibn Ezra's Commentary on the Pentateuch: Numbers (Ba-Midbar). Translated and annotated by H. Norman Strickman and Arthur M. Silver, pages 178–215. New York: Menorah Publishing Company, 1999. .
Maimonides. Mishneh Torah: Hilchot Avodat Kochavim V’Chukkoteihem (The Laws of the Worship of Stars and their Statutes), chapter 11, ¶ 16. Egypt, circa 1170–1180. Reprinted in, e.g., Mishneh Torah: Hilchot Avodat Kochavim V’Chukkoteihem: The Laws of the Worship of Stars and their Statutes.Translated by Eliyahu Touger, volume 3, pages 212–15. New York: Moznaim Publishing, 1990.  .

Maimonides. Mishneh Torah: Hilchot Shofar, Sukkah, V’Lulav (The Laws of the Shofar, Sukkah, and Lulav), chapter 3, ¶ 9. Egypt, circa 1170–1180. Reprinted in, e.g., Mishneh Torah: Hilchot Shofar, Sukkah, V’Lulav: The Laws of Shofar, Sukkah, and Lulav. Translated by Eliyahu Touger, pages 56–60. New York: Moznaim Publishing, 1988. . .
Maimonides. The Guide for the Perplexed. Cairo, Egypt, 1190. Reprinted in, e.g., Moses Maimonides. The Guide for the Perplexed. Translated by Michael Friedländer, pages 17, 29, 105, 235, 242, 264, 288, 298. New York: Dover Publications, 1956. .
Hezekiah ben Manoah. Hizkuni. France, circa 1240. Reprinted in, e.g., Chizkiyahu ben Manoach. Chizkuni: Torah Commentary. Translated and annotated by Eliyahu Munk, volume 4, pages 980–96. Jerusalem: Ktav Publishers, 2013. .
Nachmanides. Commentary on the Torah. Jerusalem, circa 1270. Reprinted in, e.g., Ramban (Nachmanides): Commentary on the Torah: Numbers. Translated by Charles B. Chavel, volume 4, pages 245–95. New York: Shilo Publishing House, 1975. .
Zohar, part 3, pages 184b–212b. Spain, late 13th century. Reprinted in, e.g., The Zohar. Translated by Harry Sperling and Maurice Simon. 5 volumes. London: Soncino Press, 1934.
Jacob ben Asher (Baal Ha-Turim). Rimze Ba'al ha-Turim. Early 14th century. Reprinted in, e.g., Baal Haturim Chumash: Bamidbar/Numbers. Translated by Eliyahu Touger; edited and annotated by Avie Gold, volume 4, pages 1619–65. Brooklyn: Mesorah Publications, 2003. .
Jacob ben Asher. Perush Al ha-Torah. Early 14th century. Reprinted in, e.g., Yaakov ben Asher. Tur on the Torah. Translated and annotated by Eliyahu Munk, volume 3, pages 1152–79. Jerusalem: Lambda Publishers, 2005. .
Isaac ben Moses Arama. Akedat Yizhak (The Binding of Isaac). Late 15th century. Reprinted in, e.g., Yitzchak Arama. Akeydat Yitzchak: Commentary of Rabbi Yitzchak Arama on the Torah. Translated and condensed by Eliyahu Munk, volume 2, pages 762–77. New York, Lambda Publishers, 2001. .

Modern
Isaac Abravanel. Commentary on the Torah. Italy, between 1492–1509. Reprinted in, e.g., Abarbanel: Selected Commentaries on the Torah: Volume 4: Bamidbar/Numbers. Translated and annotated by Israel Lazar, pages 238–73. Brooklyn: CreateSpace, 2015. .
Obadiah ben Jacob Sforno. Commentary on the Torah. Venice, 1567. Reprinted in, e.g., Sforno: Commentary on the Torah. Translation and explanatory notes by Raphael Pelcovitz, pages 764–83. Brooklyn: Mesorah Publications, 1997. .
Moshe Alshich. Commentary on the Torah. Safed, circa 1593. Reprinted in, e.g., Moshe Alshich. Midrash of Rabbi Moshe Alshich on the Torah. Translated and annotated by Eliyahu Munk, volume 3, pages 891–910. New York, Lambda Publishers, 2000. .
Israel ben Banjamin of Bełżyce. "Sermon on Balaq." Bełżyce, 1648. In Marc Saperstein. Jewish Preaching, 1200–1800: An Anthology, pages 286–300. New Haven: Yale University Press, 1989. .
Avraham Yehoshua Heschel. Commentaries on the Torah. Cracow, Poland, mid 17th century. Compiled as Chanukat HaTorah. Edited by Chanoch Henoch Erzohn. Piotrkow, Poland, 1900. Reprinted in Avraham Yehoshua Heschel. Chanukas HaTorah: Mystical Insights of Rav Avraham Yehoshua Heschel on Chumash. Translated by Avraham Peretz Friedman, pages 272–77. Southfield, Michigan: Targum Press/Feldheim Publishers, 2004. .

Thomas Hobbes. Leviathan, Review & Conclusion. England, 1651. Reprint edited by C. B. Macpherson, pages 723–24. Harmondsworth, England: Penguin Classics, 1982. .
Shabbethai Bass. Sifsei Chachamim. Amsterdam, 1680. Reprinted in, e.g., Sefer Bamidbar: From the Five Books of the Torah: Chumash: Targum Okelos: Rashi: Sifsei Chachamim: Yalkut: Haftaros, translated by Avrohom Y. Davis, pages 389–459. Lakewood Township, New Jersey: Metsudah Publications, 2013.

Chaim ibn Attar. Ohr ha-Chaim. Venice, 1742. Reprinted in Chayim ben Attar. Or Hachayim: Commentary on the Torah. Translated by Eliyahu Munk, volume 4, pages 1568–636. Brooklyn: Lambda Publishers, 1999. .
Robert Burns. I Murder Hate. Scotland, 1790. Reprinted in, e.g., The Complete Poetical Works of Robert Burns: Arranged in the Order of their Earliest Publication: Volume Second: Pieces Published Posthumously. Edited by William Scott Douglas, page 428. Kilmarnock, Scotland: M'kie and Drennan, 1876. Reprinted by Nabu Press, 2010. . ("I would not die like Socrates, / For all the fuss of Plato; / Nor would I with Leonidas, / Nor yet would I with Cato: / The zealots of the church and state / Shall ne'er my mortal foe be; / But let me have bold Zimri's fate, / Within the arms of Cozbi!")

Samuel David Luzzatto (Shadal). Commentary on the Torah. Padua, 1871. Reprinted in, e.g., Samuel David Luzzatto. Torah Commentary. Translated and annotated by Eliyahu Munk, volume 3, pages 1089–1106. New York: Lambda Publishers, 2012. .
Marcus M. Kalisch. The Prophecies of Balaam (Numbers XXII to XXIV): or, The Hebrew and the Heathen. London: Longmans, Green, and Company, 1877–1878. Reprinted BiblioLife, 2009. .

Fyodor Dostoyevsky. The Brothers Karamazov, chapter 6. Russia, 1880. Translated by, e.g., Constance Garnett, pages 134–45. Dover Publications, 2005. . (The character Smerdyakov is called "Balaam's ass.").
Samuel Cox. Balaam: An Exposition and a Study. London: Kegan Paul, Trench & Co., 1884. Reprinted Palala Press, 2015. .
Rufus P. Stebbins. "The Story of Balaam." The Old Testament Student, volume 4 (number 9) (May 1885): pages 385–95.
Yehudah Aryeh Leib Alter. Sefat Emet. Góra Kalwaria (Ger), Poland, before 1906. Excerpted in The Language of Truth: The Torah Commentary of Sefat Emet. Translated and interpreted by Arthur Green, pages 257–62. Philadelphia: Jewish Publication Society, 1998. . Reprinted 2012. .

Julius A. Bewer. "The Literary Problems of the Balaam Story in Numb., Chaps. 22–24." The American Journal of Theology, volume 9 (number 2) (April 1905): pages 238–62.
Hermann Cohen. Religion of Reason: Out of the Sources of Judaism. Translated with an introduction by Simon Kaplan; introductory essays by Leo Strauss, pages 149, 232, 341. New York: Ungar, 1972. Reprinted Atlanta: Scholars Press, 1995. . Originally published as Religion der Vernunft aus den Quellen des Judentums. Leipzig: Gustav Fock, 1919.

James Joyce. Ulysses, chapters 7 (Aeolus), 14 (Oxen of the Sun). Paris:Shakespeare and Company, 1922. Reprinted, e.g., Ulysses: The Corrected Text. Edited by Hans Walter Gabler with Wolfhard Steppe and Claus Melchior, pages 122, 322. New York: Random House, 1986. . (“No, Stephen said. I call it A Pisgah Sight of Palestine or the Parable of The Plums.”; “Look forth now, my people, upon the land of behest, even from Horeb and from Nebo and from Pisgah and from the Horns of Hatten to a land flowing with milk and money.”).

Abraham Isaac Kook. The Lights of Penitence, 15:11. 1925. Reprinted in Abraham Isaac Kook: the Lights of Penitence, the Moral Principles, Lights of Holiness, Essays, Letters, and Poems. Translated by Ben Zion Bokser, page 118. Mahwah, New Jersey: Paulist Press 1978. .
Alexander Alan Steinbach. Sabbath Queen: Fifty-four Bible Talks to the Young Based on Each Portion of the Pentateuch, pages 126–29. New York: Behrman's Jewish Book House, 1936.
Julius H. Greenstone. Numbers: With Commentary: The Holy Scriptures, pages 220–79. Philadelphia: Jewish Publication Society, 1939. Reprinted by Literary Licensing, 2011. .
Gilmore H. Guyot. "Balaam." Catholic Biblical Quarterly, volume 3 (number 3) (July 1941): pages 235–42.
Stefan C. Reif. "What Enraged Phinehas?: A Study of Numbers 25:8." Journal of Biblical Literature, volume 90 (number 2) (June 1971): pages 200–06.
Jacob Hoftijzer. "The Prophet Balaam in a 6th Century Aramaic Inscription." Biblical Archaeologist, volume 39 (number 1) (March 1976): pages 11–17.

Adin Steinsaltz. The Thirteen Petalled Rose: A Discourse on the Essence of Jewish Existence And Belief. Translated by Yehuda Hanegbi, pages 12–13. New York: Basic Books, 1980. .
Ira Clark. "Balaam's Ass: Suture or Structure." In Literary Interpretations of Biblical Narratives: Volume II. Edited by Kenneth R.R. Gros Louis, with James S. Ackerman, pages 137–44. Nashville: Abingdon Press, 1982. .
Judith R. Baskin. "Origen on Balaam: The Dilemma of the Unworthy Prophet." Vigiliae Christianae, volume 37 (number 1) (March 1983): pages 22–35.
Judith R. Baskin. Pharaoh's Counsellors: Job, Jethro, and Balaam in Rabbinic and Patristic Tradition. Brown Judaic Studies, 1983. .
Philip J. Budd. Word Biblical Commentary: Volume 5: Numbers, pages 248–83. Waco, Texas: Word Books, 1984. .
André Lemaire. "Fragments from the Book of Balaam Found at Deir Alla: Text foretells cosmic disaster." Biblical Archaeology Review, volume 11 (number 5) (September/October 1985).
Jo Ann Hackett. "Some Observations on the Balaam Tradition at Deir Alla." Biblical Archaeologist, volume 49 (1986): pages 216–22.
Pinchas H. Peli. Torah Today: A Renewed Encounter with Scripture, pages 181–83. Washington, D.C.: B'nai B'rith Books, 1987. .
Jonathan D. Safren. "Balaam and Abraham." Vetus Testamentum, volume 38 (number 1) (January 1988): pages 105–13.
Jacob Milgrom. The JPS Torah Commentary: Numbers: The Traditional Hebrew Text with the New JPS Translation, pages 185–215, 467–80. Philadelphia: Jewish Publication Society, 1990. .
Mark S. Smith. The Early History of God: Yahweh and the Other Deities in Ancient Israel, pages 21, 23, 29, 51, 63, 127–28. New York: HarperSanFrancisco, 1990. .The Balaam Text from Deir `Alla Re-evaluated: Proceedings of the International Symposium Held at Leiden, 21–24 August 1989. Edited by J. Hoftijzer and G. van der Kooij. New York: E.J. Brill, 1991. .
Mary Douglas. In the Wilderness: The Doctrine of Defilement in the Book of Numbers, pages xix, 86–87, 100, 121, 123, 136, 188, 191, 200–01, 211, 214, 216–18, 220–24. Oxford: Oxford University Press, 1993. Reprinted 2004. .
Mary Douglas. Balaam's Place in the Book of Numbers." Man, volume 28 (new series) (number 3) (September 1993): pages 411–30.
Aaron Wildavsky. Assimilation versus Separation: Joseph the Administrator and the Politics of Religion in Biblical Israel, page 31. New Brunswick, New Jersey: Transaction Publishers, 1993. .
Judith S. Antonelli. "Kazbi: Midianite Princess." In In the Image of God: A Feminist Commentary on the Torah, pages 368–76. Northvale, New Jersey: Jason Aronson, 1995. .
David Frankel. "The Deuteronomic Portrayal of Balaam." Vetus Testamentum, volume 46 (number 1) (January 1996): pages 30–42.

Ellen Frankel. The Five Books of Miriam: A Woman's Commentary on the Torah, pages 228–33. New York: G. P. Putnam's Sons, 1996. .
W. Gunther Plaut. The Haftarah Commentary, pages 387–95. New York: UAHC Press, 1996. .
Sorel Goldberg Loeb and Barbara Binder Kadden. Teaching Torah: A Treasury of Insights and Activities, pages 266–71. Denver: A.R.E. Publishing, 1997. .
Harriet Lutzky. "Ambivalence toward Balaam." Vetus Testamentum, volume 49 (number 3) (July 1999): pages 421–25.
Diane Aronson Cohen. "The End of Abuse." In The Women's Torah Commentary: New Insights from Women Rabbis on the 54 Weekly Torah Portions. Edited by Elyse Goldstein, pages 301–06. Woodstock, Vermont: Jewish Lights Publishing, 2000. .
Baruch A. Levine. Numbers 21–36, volume 4A, pages 135–303. New York: Anchor Bible, 2000. .
Dennis T. Olson. "Numbers." In The HarperCollins Bible Commentary. Edited by James L. Mays, pages 180–82. New York: HarperCollins Publishers, revised edition, 2000. .
Lainie Blum Cogan and Judy Weiss. Teaching Haftarah: Background, Insights, and Strategies, pages 574–83. Denver: A.R.E. Publishing, 2002. .
Michael Fishbane. The JPS Bible Commentary: Haftarot, pages 244–50. Philadelphia: Jewish Publication Society, 2002. .
John J. Collins. "The Zeal of Phinehas: The Bible and the Legitimation of Violence." Journal of Biblical Literature, volume 122 (number 1) (Spring 2003): pages 3–21.
Martti Nissinen, Choon-Leong Seow, and Robert K. Ritner. Prophets and Prophecy in the Ancient Near East. Edited by Peter Machinist. Atlanta: Society of Biblical Literature, 2003. .
Robert Alter. The Five Books of Moses: A Translation with Commentary, pages 795–819. New York: W.W. Norton & Co., 2004. .
Jane Kanarek. "Haftarat Balak: Micah 5:6–6:8." In The Women's Haftarah Commentary: New Insights from Women Rabbis on the 54 Weekly Haftarah Portions, the 5 Megillot & Special Shabbatot. Edited by Elyse Goldstein, pages 190–94. Woodstock, Vermont: Jewish Lights Publishing, 2004. .Professors on the Parashah: Studies on the Weekly Torah Reading Edited by Leib Moscovitz, pages 275–79. Jerusalem: Urim Publications, 2005. .
Aaron Wildavsky. Moses as Political Leader, pages 50–55. Jerusalem: Shalem Press, 2005. .
W. Gunther Plaut. The Torah: A Modern Commentary: Revised Edition. Revised edition edited by David E.S. Stern, pages 1047–71. New York: Union for Reform Judaism, 2006. .
Suzanne A. Brody. "Ma Tovu." In Dancing in the White Spaces: The Yearly Torah Cycle and More Poems, page 99. Shelbyville, Kentucky: Wasteland Press, 2007. .

James L. Kugel. How To Read the Bible: A Guide to Scripture, Then and Now, pages 64, 115, 336–40, 421, 440, 622, 658. New York: Free Press, 2007. .The Torah: A Women's Commentary. Edited by Tamara Cohn Eskenazi and Andrea L. Weiss, pages 937–60. New York: URJ Press, 2008. .
R. Dennis Cole. "Numbers." In Zondervan Illustrated Bible Backgrounds Commentary. Edited by John H. Walton, volume 1, pages 378–86. Grand Rapids, Michigan: Zondervan, 2009. .
Reuven Hammer. Entering Torah: Prefaces to the Weekly Torah Portion, pages 231–35. New York: Gefen Publishing House, 2009. .
Lori Hope Lefkovitz. "Between Beast and Angel: The Queer, Fabulous Self: Parashat Balak (Numbers 22:2–25:10)." In Torah Queeries: Weekly Commentaries on the Hebrew Bible. Edited by Gregg Drinkwater, Joshua Lesser, and David Shneer; foreword by Judith Plaskow, pages 212–15. New York: New York University Press, 2009. .
Carolyn J. Sharp. “Oracular Indeterminacy and Dramatic Irony in the Story of Balaam.” In Irony and Meaning in the Hebrew Bible, pages 134–51. Bloomington, Indiana: Indiana University Press, 2009. .
Kenneth C. Way. “Animals in the Prophetic World: Literary Reflections on Numbers 22 and 1 Kings 13.” Journal for the Study of the Old Testament, volume 34 (number 1) (September 2009): pages 47–62.
Terence E. Fretheim. "Numbers." In The New Oxford Annotated Bible: New Revised Standard Version with the Apocrypha: An Ecumenical Study Bible. Edited by Michael D. Coogan, Marc Z. Brettler, Carol A. Newsom, and Pheme Perkins, pages 222–28. New York: Oxford University Press, Revised 4th Edition 2010. .
Joann Scurlock. “Departure of Ships? An Investigation of יצ in Numbers 24.24 and Isaiah 33.23.” Journal for the Study of the Old Testament, volume 34 (number 3) (March 2010): pages 267–82.
Shawn Zelig Aster. “‘Bread of the Dungheap’: Light on Numbers 21:5 from the Tell Fekherye Inscription.” Vetus Testamentum, volume 61 (number 3) (2011): pages 341–58.The Commentators' Bible: Numbers: The JPS Miqra'ot Gedolot. Edited, translated, and annotated by Michael Carasik, pages 163–92. Philadelphia: Jewish Publication Society, 2011. .
Josebert Fleurant. “Phinehas Murdered Moses’ Wife: An Analysis of Numbers 25.” Journal for the Study of the Old Testament, volume 35  (number 3) (March 2011): pages 285–94.

Calum Carmichael. "Sexual and Religious Seduction (Numbers 25–31)." In The Book of Numbers: A Critique of Genesis, pages 135–58. New Haven: Yale University Press, 2012. .
Shmuel Herzfeld. "Intergenerational Sparring." In Fifty-Four Pick Up: Fifteen-Minute Inspirational Torah Lessons, pages 227–33. Jerusalem: Gefen Publishing House, 2012. .

Clinton J. Moyer. “Who Is the Prophet, and Who the Ass? Role-Reversing Interludes and the Unity of the Balaam Narrative (Numbers 22–24).” Journal for the Study of the Old Testament, volume 37 (number 2) (December 2012): pages 167–83.
Shlomo Riskin. Torah Lights: Bemidbar: Trials and Tribulations in Times of Transition, pages 179–204. New Milford, Connecticut: Maggid Books, 2012. .
Mark Douek. "A Righteous Balaam: Balaam's Character According to Maimonides." (2013).
Nili S. Fox. "Numbers." In The Jewish Study Bible: Second Edition. Edited by Adele Berlin and Marc Zvi Brettler. New York: Oxford University Press, 2014. .
Haim O. Rechnitzer. "The Magical Mystery Tour: The stage is set for the final battle between the mystical mode and the magical one." The Jerusalem Report, volume 25 (number 7) (July 14, 2014): page 47.
Avivah Gottlieb Zornberg. Bewilderments: Reflections on the Book of Numbers, pages 234–62. New York: Schocken Books, 2015. .

Jonathan Sacks. Lessons in Leadership: A Weekly Reading of the Jewish Bible, pages 217–20. New Milford, Connecticut: Maggid Books, 2015. .
Jonathan Sacks. Essays on Ethics: A Weekly Reading of the Jewish Bible, pages 251–55. New Milford, Connecticut: Maggid Books, 2016. .
Shai Held. The Heart of Torah, Volume 2: Essays on the Weekly Torah Portion: Leviticus, Numbers, and Deuteronomy, pages 158–67. Philadelphia: Jewish Publication Society, 2017. .
Steven Levy and Sarah Levy. The JPS Rashi Discussion Torah Commentary, pages 134–37. Philadelphia: Jewish Publication Society, 2017. .
Jonathan Sacks. Numbers: The Wilderness Years: Covenant & Conversation: A Weekly Reading of the Jewish Bible'', pages 283–312. New Milford, Connecticut: Maggid Books, 2017. .

External links

Texts
Masoretic text and 1917 JPS translation
Hear the parashah chanted
Hear the parashah read in Hebrew

Commentaries

| width="25%" align="left" valign="top" style="border:0"|
Academy for Jewish Religion, California
Academy for Jewish Religion, New York
Aish.com
Akhlah: The Jewish Children's Learning Network 
Aleph Beta Academy
American Jewish University — Ziegler School of Rabbinic Studies
Anshe Emes Synagogue, Los Angeles 
Ari Goldwag
Ascent of Safed
Bar-Ilan University
Chabad.org
eparsha.com
| width="25%" align="top" style="border:0"|
G-dcast
The Israel Koschitzky Virtual Beit Midrash
Jewish Agency for Israel
Jewish Theological Seminary
Kabbala Online 
Mechon Hadar
Miriam Aflalo
MyJewishLearning.com
Ohr Sameach
Orthodox Union
OzTorah, Torah from Australia
Oz Ve Shalom — Netivot Shalom
| width="25%" align="top" style="border:0"|
Pardes from Jerusalem
Professor James L. Kugel
Professor Michael Carasik
Rabbi Dov Linzer
Rabbi Fabian Werbin
Rabbi Jonathan Sacks
RabbiShimon.com 
Rabbi Shlomo Riskin
Rabbi Shmuel Herzfeld
Rabbi Stan Levin
Reconstructionist Judaism 
Sephardic Institute
| width="25%" align="top" style="border:0"|
Shiur.com
613.org Jewish Torah Audio
Tanach Study Center
TheTorah.com
Torah from Dixie
Torah.org
TorahVort.com
Union for Reform Judaism
United Synagogue of Conservative Judaism
What's Bothering Rashi?
Yeshiva University
Yeshivat Chovevei Torah

Weekly Torah readings in Tammuz (Hebrew month)
Weekly Torah readings from Numbers